Shepard Settlement Cemetery is a historic cemetery located at Shepard Settlement, Onondaga County, New York. It was established about 1823, and remains an active burial ground containing approximately 500 burials.  It is notable for including the graves of at least 30 veterans of all wars from the Revolutionary War to World War II. The gravestones are representative of typical funerary art of the mid-19th century.

It was listed on the National Register of Historic Places in 2010.

References

External links
 

Cemeteries on the National Register of Historic Places in New York (state)
1823 establishments in New York (state)
Buildings and structures in Onondaga County, New York
National Register of Historic Places in Onondaga County, New York